HMS Untamed was a Royal Navy U-class submarine built by Vickers-Armstrongs. So far, she has been the only ship of the Royal Navy to bear the name Untamed.  On May 30, 1943, she sank during a training exercise in the Firth of Clyde with the loss of all 35 of her crew. Untamed was subsequently salvaged and renamed HMS Vitality, another unique name, and lasted until 1946 when she was scrapped.

Sinking
Untamed was on a training exercise with the 8th Escort Group in the Firth of Clyde on 30 May 1943 acting as a target.
In the second exercise that day, Untamed was used as a target for anti-submarine mortar practice by the yacht HMS Shemara. When the submarine did not respond to attempts to contact her nor surface, assistance was summoned. Shemara located Untamed with sonar and heard the sounds of her engines being run and tanks being blown.  arrived but no more was heard from Untamed after 17:45 – nearly three hours from the first indication of a problem. Weather prevented divers inspecting the submarine until 1 June. There was no outward sign of damage and it was not until after Untamed was salvaged on 5 July 1943 that it was found that she had been flooded through a sluice valve.

Untamed was salvaged, refitted and named Vitality, returning to service in July 1944. As Vitality, she had a short and uneventful career and was sold to be broken up for scrap on 13 February 1946. She was broken up at Troon.

The Sandbank War Memorial at Hunters Quay is in part dedicated to the crew of Untamed who were buried at Dunoon cemetery.

Notes

References

External links
 The National Archives original design plans of Untamed

 

British U-class submarines
Ships built on the River Tyne
1942 ships
World War II submarines of the United Kingdom
British submarine accidents
Shipwrecks of Scotland
1943 disasters in the United Kingdom
Maritime incidents in May 1943